Sydney Hughes Greenstreet (December 27, 1879 – January 18, 1954) was a British-American actor. While he did not begin his career in films until the age of 61, he had a run of significant motion pictures in a Hollywood career lasting through the 1940s. He is best remembered for his Warner Bros. films with Humphrey Bogart and Peter Lorre, including The Maltese Falcon (1941), Casablanca (1942), and Passage to Marseille (1944). He portrayed Nero Wolfe on radio during 1950 and 1951. He became an American citizen in 1925.

Early life
Sydney Hughes Greenstreet was born on December 27, 1879, in Eastry, Kent, the son of Ann (née Baker) and John Jarvis Greenstreet, a tanner. He had seven siblings. He left home at the age of 18 to make his fortune as a Ceylon tea planter, but drought forced him out of business. He began managing a brewery and, to escape boredom, took acting lessons.

Career
Greenstreet's stage debut was as a murderer in a 1902 production of a Sherlock Holmes story at the Marina Theatre, Ramsgate, Kent. He toured Britain with Ben Greet's Shakespearean company, and in 1905 made his New York City debut in Everyman. He appeared in such plays as a revival of As You Like It (1914). He appeared in numerous plays in Britain and America, working through most of the 1930s with Alfred Lunt and Lynn Fontanne at the Theatre Guild. His stage roles ranged from musical comedy to Shakespeare, and years of such versatile acting on two continents led to many offers to appear in films. He refused until he was 61.

In 1941, Greenstreet began working for Warner Bros. His debut film role was as Kasper Gutman ("The Fat Man") co-starring with Humphrey Bogart in The Maltese Falcon. In Casablanca (1942), Greenstreet played crooked club owner Signor Ferrari (for which he received a salary of $3,750 per week—equivalent to $60,179.91 in 2020 dollars—for seven weeks' work). He also appeared in Background to Danger (1943), with George Raft; Passage to Marseille (1944), reuniting with Casablanca stars Bogart, Peter Lorre and Claude Rains; The Mask of Dimitrios (1944); The Conspirators (1944) with Hedy Lamarr and Paul Henreid; Hollywood Canteen (1944); Conflict (1945), again with Bogart; Three Strangers (1946); and The Verdict (1946). In the last two, and The Mask of Dimitrios, he received top billing. He had dramatic roles, such as William Makepeace Thackeray in Devotion (1946), and witty performances in screwball comedies, such as Alexander Yardley in Christmas in Connecticut (1944). Near the end of his film career, he played opposite Joan Crawford in Flamingo Road (1949).

After little more than eight years, Greenstreet's film career ended with Malaya (also 1949), in which he was billed third, after Spencer Tracy and James Stewart. In those years, he worked with stars ranging from Clark Gable to Ava Gardner to Joan Crawford. Author Tennessee Williams wrote his one-act play The Last of My Solid Gold Watches with Greenstreet in mind, and dedicated it to him. During 1950–1951, Greenstreet played Nero Wolfe on the radio program The New Adventures of Nero Wolfe, based loosely on the rotund detective genius created by Rex Stout.

Death and legacy
Greenstreet suffered from diabetes and Bright's disease, a kidney disorder. Five years after leaving films, he died in 1954 in Hollywood owing to complications from both conditions. He is interred at Forest Lawn Memorial Park, Glendale, California, in the Utility Columbarium area of the Great Mausoleum, inaccessible to the public. He was survived by his only child, John Ogden Greenstreet (1920–2004), from his marriage to Dorothy Marie Ogden. Actor Mark Greenstreet is his great-nephew.

Academy Award nomination

Filmography

References

Further reading
 
 
  – Contains a chapter on the professional friendship between Greenstreet and Peter Lorre.

External links

 
 
 
 
 

1879 births
1954 deaths
20th-century English male actors
British expatriate male actors in the United States
Burials at Forest Lawn Memorial Park (Glendale)
Deaths from diabetes
Deaths from kidney disease
English male film actors
English male radio actors
English male stage actors
Male actors from Kent
Naturalized citizens of the United States
Nero Wolfe
People from Sandwich, Kent
Warner Bros. contract players